Supremo may refer to:
Supremo (film), a 2012 Filipino biographical film about Andrés Bonifacio
 Supremo (album), a 2011 album by Chino y Nacho
 Supremo (comics), a 1980s character based on Indian movie star Amitabh Bachchan
 Teamo Supremo, an animated television series

See also
 El Supremo (disambiguation)
 Supreme (disambiguation)
 Suprema (disambiguation)